Aeromonas enteropelogenes is a Gram-negative, motile bacterium of the genus Aeromonas isolated from human stool in Varanasi, in India.

References

External links
Type strain of Aeromonas enteropelogenes at BacDive -  the Bacterial Diversity Metadatabase

Aeromonadales
Bacteria described in 1991